masFlight was a US cloud-based, big data, SaaS aviation software and data services company based in Bethesda, Maryland, with offices in Reston, Virginia and Ontario, California. The company was founded in 2010 and was acquired by Global Eagle Entertainment on August 4, 2015. The company is now part of the GEE Operations Solutions business unit. masFlight focused on the collection and analysis of large amounts of commercial aircraft operational data globally, from sources such as global flight information systems, schedules, ADS-B and proprietary information sources. masFlight's technology used the cloud to store daily flight profiles and tracks of individual commercial aircraft. The company sold this data and analysis to airlines and related parties such as aircraft lessors and aircraft OEMs.

masFlight is a Strategic Partner of the International Air Transport Association (IATA)

The company was regularly cited in media reports on commercial aviation issues, including the Wall St Journal, CNBC, CNN, TIME Magazine  and Bloomberg News.

References

External links

 

American companies established in 2010
Companies based in Bethesda, Maryland
Internet technology companies of the United States
American travel websites
Aviation websites
Internet properties established in 2010
Privately held companies based in Maryland
Aerospace companies of the United States
2010 establishments in Maryland